Nebojša Mladenović (born 19 October 1967) is a retired Serbian football striker.

References

1967 births
Living people
Serbian footballers
AEP Paphos FC players
Apollon Limassol FC players
Doxa Katokopias FC players
Ethnikos Assia FC players
Ethnikos Achna FC players
Anagennisi Deryneia FC players
Association football forwards
Cypriot First Division players
Serbian expatriate footballers
Expatriate footballers in Cyprus
Serbian expatriate sportspeople in Cyprus